Jeffery Allen Hodge (born November 18, 1966) is an American retired professional basketball player.  He was a second round pick in the 1989 NBA draft out of the University of South Alabama.

High school
Hodge played basketball at Woodlawn High School. He won multiple awards:
6A Player of the Year
Super 5
Was one of many players from his high school to play in All State or All Tournament.

College career
Hodge was well known for his 3-pointer against the state rivals, University of Alabama. He sank the needed 3-pointer with two seconds left in regulation; it was needed to win the game and advance. This happened in the first round of the National Collegiate Athletic Association Southeast Regional Tournament. In the next game South Alabama would play the eventual NCAA Division I champion University of Michigan, but would lose 91–82.

During their playing days at South Alabama, fellow guard Junie Lewis and Hodge were usually referred to as "peanut butter and jelly", respectively. Hodge's jersey (5) was retired alongside Lewis's in a ceremony on January 20, 2018.

Professional career
Following the close of his college career, Hodge was drafted in the second round of the 1989 NBA draft (53rd pick overall) by the Dallas Mavericks.  He never played in the NBA, but did play in the Continental Basketball Association (CBA) for the Wichita Falls Texans and Oklahoma City Cavalry.  He averaged 17 points per game for his 64-game CBA career.

References

External links
Jeff Hodge Player Profile, South Alabama, NCAA Stats, Awards – RealGM

1966 births
Living people
American men's basketball players
Basketball players from Birmingham, Alabama
Dallas Mavericks draft picks
Guards (basketball)
Oklahoma City Cavalry players
South Alabama Jaguars men's basketball players
Wichita Falls Texans players
American expatriate basketball people in the Philippines
Philippine Basketball Association imports
TNT Tropang Giga players